The Ocean County Vocational Technical School is a public school district based in Toms River that provides technical and vocational education to residents of Ocean County, New Jersey, United States. The district provides a number of full-time public high school programs and also serves adult students. The district operates under the supervision of the Ocean County Board of County Commissioners and an appointed Board of Education.

As of the 2020–21 school year, the district, comprised of seven schools, had an enrollment of 649 students and 124.2 classroom teachers (on an FTE basis), for a student–teacher ratio of 5.2:1.

History
The district was established in 1959 with the creation of a Licensed Practical Nurse training program. Trade and technical programs for high school students was initiated in 1963. Initially, all programs were based in Toms River. Centers were opened in Brick Township, Jackson Township and the Waretown section of Ocean Township in 1972.

In 1994, the Career & Technical Institute (CTI) was opened in Hangar No. 1 at the Lakehurst Naval Air Station, offering adult programs in aviation and electronics, as well as a full-time academy program for high school students, the district's first. The Marine Academy of Technology and Environmental Science (MATES) was created in 1997. In 1998, the Culinary Arts Academy was established and the Academy of the Arts and Graphic Design Technology opened in 1999.

Awards and recognition
The Performing Arts Academy was one of 11 in the state to be recognized in 2014 by the United States Department of Education's National Blue Ribbon Schools Program.

Academic programs
Full-time academic programs available through the district (with 2020–21 enrollment data from the National Center for Education Statistics) are:
Career academies
Marine Academy of Technology and Environmental Science (MATES) (277 students; grades 9-12)
OCVTS Performing Arts Academy - Theater and Dance (278; 9-12) 
Academy of Law and Public Safety - Criminal Justice and Homeland Security (81; 9-12)

Other programs
Ocean County Vocational Technical School Brick Center (4; 9-12)
Ocean County Vocational Technical School Culinary Center (NA; Ungraded)
Ocean County Vocational Technical School Jackson Center (3; 9-12)
Ocean County Vocational Technical School Toms River Center (7; 9-12)

Administration
Core members of the district's administration are:
Karen L. Homiek, Superintendent
Frank J. Frazee, Business Administrator / Board Secretary

References

External links
Ocean County Vocational Technical School
 
School Data for the Ocean County Vocational Technical School, National Center for Education Statistics

Toms River, New Jersey
School districts in Ocean County, New Jersey
Vocational school districts in New Jersey